José Andrés Rafael Zaldívar Larraín, (born March 18, 1936) popularly known as El Chico Zaldívar ("Short Zaldívar"), is a prominent Chilean Christian Democrat politician. Andrés Zaldívar is of Basque descent.

Early years

Zaldívar was born in Santiago, Chile. He attended primary and secondary school at the Instituto Alonso de Ercilla de Santiago, a member of the Congregación de los Hermanos Maristas. In 1959 Zaldívar graduated from the Universidad de Chile, having written the thesis ""Rental Laws, Commentaries and Jurisprudence".'<ref>Ley de Arrendamientos: Comentarios y Jurisprudencia,</ref>

In 1952 Zaldívar began his political career by joining the Conservative Party. while attending university, he participated in the International Congress of Students in Chicago in 1956 representing Chile, as the Secretary of the Union of Federated Universities of Chile. In 1957 he joined the Christian Democrat Party, and served as Juvenile President for Santiago's Third District.

Zaldívar practiced law in the Municipality of Colina from 1959 to 1962, then became magistrate of the local police of La Cisterna.

Political career

In the government of Eduardo Frei, Zaldívar served as Undersecretary of Finance from 1964 to 1967. He became Minister of Finance in 1968 and Minister of both Finance and Economy, in 1970. From 1968 to 1970, Zaldívar served as governor of the Inter-American Development Bank and was representative to the Interamerican Committee of the Alliance for Progress in Washington from 1968 to 1969 and representative to the Economic and Social Committee in Caracas in 1970.

During the years of the Popular Unity coalition, Zaldívar served many different posts within the party: from 1970 to 1973 he was a national counselor of the Christian Democrats, in 1972 he became a member of the Political Committee, and from 1976 to 1982 he was the president of the Christian Democrats. As such, he became one of the main leaders of the opposition to the Pinochet military regime at that time.

Military regime

In 1973, Zaldívar for the first time became a member of the National Congress of Chile, upon election to the Senate of Chile for the Second Provincial District of Atacama and Coquimbo, joining the Economic Committee of Congress. However, after the Chilean coup of 1973, Congress was dissolved on September 21 and Zaldívar went into exile  with his family in Spain. Returning to Chile the following year, Zaldívar became president of the Christian Democrat Party, from 1975 to 1982.

In exile, Zaldívar was made President of the International Christian Democrats, an international organization of political parties, from 1981 to 1986, when he became a member of its advisory council. In 1981, furthermore, Zaldívar was a founding member of Center for Research for Ibero-America and Spain (CIPIE) in Spain, holding the position of president. In 1988, he joined the successful "No" campaign for the national plebiscite of that year. Also in 1988, Zaldívar again became the president of his party for another two years.

Administrations of the Concertación

In 1989, Zaldívar was elected Senator for the VII District of West Santiago, in one of the most hard-fought elections in history. Zaldívar received 31.27% of the vote while his partner on the list, future president Ricardo Lagos, received 30.62%. Due to Chile's binomial voting system (where parties or coalitions of parties select lists of one or more candidates, and the top candidate from each of the top two lists is elected when the top list gets less than twice the second-place list) and since no concessions could get double the votes of the Democracy and Progress, Andrés Zaldívar and the Independent Democrat Union's  Jaime Guzmán, who only received 17.91% of the vote were elected.

At this time, Zaldívar  joined the Senate Public Works Committee and presided over the Finance Committee. In December of the same year, he was re-elected Senator with 27.77% of the vote. His partner on the list, Camilo Escalona, received 15.98% principally due to the migration of votes from the left to the candidate of the Communist Party of Chile, Gladys Marín Millie, who received 15.69% of the vote. This allowed Zaldívar to be elected together with the conservative Jovino Novoa, with 20.56% of the vote.

During the second period since the rise of democracy, Zaldívar participated in the Constitution, Legislation, Justice, and Regulation Committees and presided over the Interior Administration Committee. In March 1998, Zaldívar was elected President of the Senate, a post that he held until August 15, 2004.

In 1999, Zaldívar was a candidate for President of Chile, representing the Christian Democrat Party for the primary election of the Chilean presidential election of that year. Meanwhile, the coalition PPD/PS (Party for Democracy and  Socialist Party of Chile) elected Ricardo Lagos as its primary candidate. In that year, the Coalition of Parties for Democracy (the Concertación) held a primary to decide between the two. Lagos won the vote, with 71.3% of the vote to Zaldívar's 28.7%.

In 2005, Zaldívar ran for the third consecutive time for the Senate seat of West Santiago at the Chilean parliamentary election of December 11, facing the Deputy Guido Girardi (PPD) (his coalition partner on the list), the Senator Jovino Novoa (UDI), and the businessman Roberto Fantuzzi (Independent); the latter two members of the Alliance for Chile coalition. Despite a strong campaign, Zaldívar did not retain his seat in the senate, although he exceeded the top candidate of his opponents' list, since the Democratic Coalition's votes did not double that of the Alliance for Chile, fellow Democratic Coalition member Guido Girardi was elected and Alliance for Chile member, the founder and president of Independent Democrat Union, Jovino Novoa was reelected.

However, in later days, Zaldívar became a leader and chief strategist of Michelle Bachelet's presidential campaign. After the victory of the socialist candidate Bachelet, Zaldívar was appointed as her Minister of the Interior.

On 21 March 2017 he succeeded Ricardo Lagos Weber as President of the Senate.

 Trivia 

 Zaldívar's nickname, "Chico" alias "Shorty", comes from his extremely short height.
 In the Chilean telenovela Hippie'', set in the early 1970s, Zaldívar had a small cameo as himself since at that time he was a member of the Congress. He was shown being interviewed by a group of college students outside of the National Congress in Santiago.

Notes and references

 Official website of Andrés Zaldívar 
Government Biography 

1936 births
Living people
Members of the Senate of Chile
Chilean Ministers of the Interior
Chilean Ministers of Economy
Chilean Ministers of Finance
Chilean democracy activists
Chilean people of Basque descent
People from Santiago
Christian Democratic Party (Chile) politicians
Presidents of the Senate of Chile
Candidates for President of Chile
Zaldivar